Chelutay (Shuluuta) is a rural locality (a settlement) in Zaigrayevsky District, Republic of Buryatia, Russia. The population was 458 as of 2010. There are 7 streets.

References 

Rural localities in Zaigrayevsky District